Bő is a village in Sárvár District of Vas County, Hungary with a population of 679 (2004). It covers an area of 10.66 km2.

External links 
 Street map 

Populated places in Vas County